The Dutch Sprint Championships of speed skating, organised by the KNSB, is the official Dutch championship to determine the Dutch Sprint champion. The Sprint distance championships date back to 1969 for men and 1983 for women.

Men's sprint

Source: www.knsb.nl, schaatsen.nl

Women's sprint

Source: www.knsb.nl, schaatsen.nl

See also
 KNSB Dutch Allround Championships

References

Dutch Speed Skating Championships
Speed skating in the Netherlands